Leighlinbridge is a small town on the River Barrow in County Carlow, Ireland. The N9 National primary route once passed through the village, which was by-passed in the 1980s. It now lies on the R705 regional road.

It covers the townlands of Leighlin (east bank of the river) and Ballyknockan (west bank). The village features narrow winding streets, grey limestone malthouses and castle ruins overlooking a 14th-century bridge across the River Barrow. Leighlinbridge has won the National Tidy Towns Competition, has come first in the Barrow Awards, been an overall national winner in Ireland's Green Town 2000, and represented Ireland in the European "Entente Florale" competition in 2001.

Places of interest
Leighlinbridge Castle, also called Black Castle, was one of Ireland's earliest Norman castles. A 50 ft tall broken castle tower and bawn wall are all that can be seen today.

Leighlinbridge meteorite
On the night of 28 November 1999, a loud detonation and bright fireball was observed over Carlow for several seconds. An elderly lady in Leighlinbridge recovered a fusion crusted individual meteoritic rock on 12 December 1999, and later two more specimens were found. It is now officially called the "Leighlinbridge" by the International Meteorite Nomenclature Committee. The meteorites, totalled 271.4 grams in weight.

Sports

Gaelic games
In Leighlinbridge there are three GAA clubs, Naomh Bríd, Leighlinbridge and Micheal Davitts. Naomh Bríd are a hurling club who compete in both the Carlow Senior Hurling Championship and the Carlow Intermediate Hurling Championship and all underage hurling competitions. Leighlinbridge are a football club who compete in the Carlow Junior Football Championship. Micheal Davitts are a football club who compete at underage level in Carlow. Players from neighbouring villages Old Leighlin and Ballinabranna combine with Leighlinbridge to play for Micheal Davits.

Soccer
Vale Wanderers is the local soccer club in Leighlinbridge. They are represented at both underage and senior levels.

Education
The local primary school is Leighlinbridge N.S. The most recent report by Department of Education inspectors noted the "welcoming, supportive and inclusive school atmosphere", and the "high quality teaching, as well as the openness and reflectivity that exists amongst the teaching staff".

People
Cardinal Patrick Francis Moran, third Archbishop of Sydney, was born in Leighlinbridge in 1830.
John Tyndall, prominent 19th-century physicist, was born in Main Street, Leighlinbridge in 1820.
Myles Keogh, American Civil War military officer and later Captain of Company I, U.S. 7th Cavalry Regiment. Fought in Indian Wars and was killed at the Battle of the Little Bighorn in 1876. He was born in Orchard, Leighlinbridge in 1840.

See also
List of towns and villages in Ireland

References

External links

Website of Leighlinbridge NS
Leighlinbridge Tidy Towns
Leighlinbridge Tourism

Towns and villages in County Carlow